A total solar eclipse took place on Saturday, December 4, 2021, when the Moon passed between Earth and the Sun, thereby totally or partly obscuring the image of the Sun for a viewer on Earth. This eclipse was unusual as the path of the total eclipse moved from east to west across West Antarctica, while most eclipse paths move from west to east.  This reversal is only possible in polar regions. Its path across Antarctica crossed near Berkner Island, traversed an arc over the continent and passed over Shepard Island.

Images

Related eclipses

Eclipses of 2021 
 A total lunar eclipse on May 26.
 An annular solar eclipse on June 10.
 A partial lunar eclipse on November 19.

Tzolkinex 
 Preceded: Solar eclipse of October 23, 2014

 Followed: Solar eclipse of January 14, 2029

Half-Saros cycle 
 Preceded: Lunar eclipse of November 28, 2012

 Followed: Lunar eclipse of December 9, 2030

Tritos 
 Preceded: Solar eclipse of January 4, 2011

 Followed: Solar eclipse of November 3, 2032

Solar Saros 152 
 Preceded: Solar eclipse of November 23, 2003

 Followed: Solar eclipse of December 15, 2039

Inex 
 Preceded: Solar eclipse of December 24, 1992

 Followed: Solar eclipse of November 14, 2050

Triad 
 Preceded: Solar eclipse of February 3, 1935

 Followed: Solar eclipse of October 5, 2108

Solar eclipses of 2018–2021

Saros 152

Metonic series

Notes

References
 solar-eclipse.de: The total solar eclipse of 12/04/2021

2021 12 04
2021 in science
2021 12 04
December 2021 events